El Gran Grifón was the flagship of the Spanish Armada's supply squadron of Baltic hulks (built in and chartered from the City of Rostock, in modern-day Germany); see List of Ships of the Spanish Armada. She was shipwrecked on Fair Isle, Shetland, Scotland, on 27 September 1588.

The 650-ton 38-gun ship sailed under the command and section flag of Juan Gómez de Medina and not – as often quoted – under the command of Don Alonso Pérez de Guzmán el Bueno, 7th Duke of Medina Sidonia, Admiral of Spain and commanding officer of the Armada.

She had been attacked by the Revenge and badly damaged right in the first meeting in the Channel, but managed somehow to escape into the open North Sea where she later met the rest of the beaten Armada. Because of leaks she had to run before the wind up the east coast of Britain. However, an unusually strong storm and the tides forced the ships to cross between Norway and the Northern Isles for about a week before they reached the Atlantic. Having the coast of Ireland nearly in sight, many ships were thrown back north by another storm. El Gran Grifón, the Barca de Amburgo (a hulk, chartered from the City of Hamburg) and the Trinidad Valencera (1,100-tons, one of the biggest ships of the Armada) were separated from the remaining fleet. The Barca de Amburgo foundered south west of the Fair Isle, but was able to split her crew between El Gran Grifon and the Trinidad Valencera (later wrecked in Irish waters). Thus El Gran Grifón carried 43 crew and 234 soldiers – far more sailors and armed forces than standard.

When El Gran Grifón arrived at Fair Isle on 27 September 1588 trying to find a haven to effect repairs, she anchored in Swartz Geo, but the tide drove the ship ashore so that she wrecked on the rocks of Stroms Hellier. The crew and soldiers scrambled ashore, and were stranded on the isle for about two months before Andrew Umphray, the owner of Fair Isle, heard about the shipwrecked sailors and took Gomez de Medina to Quendale on the Shetland mainland where he stayed with Malcolm Sinclair of Quendale. Most of the Spanish sailors departed first for Orkney (where they are still remembered as the "Westray Dons"), and then to St Andrews and then to Edinburgh. 50 of the men died on Fair Isle either of their wounds or starvation or exposure and were buried in the "Spaniards' Grave". Half of the survivors were killed when their ship en route to Spain was attacked and sent aground by Dutch gunboats alerted by the English Navy (Queen Elizabeth had only promised that they would not be molested by English ships).

The wreck of El Gran Grifón was excavated by Colin Martin and Sydney Wignall in 1970. In 1984 a delegation from Spain planted an iron cross in the island's cemetery in remembrance of the sailors who had died there.

References

Wreck diving sites in Scotland
Ships of the Spanish Navy
Spanish Armada
16th-century maritime incidents
History of Shetland
1588 in Scotland
Fair Isle
Underwater archaeology